Aniptodera is a genus of fungi in the Halosphaeriaceae family. The genus contains nine species.

References

External links
Aniptodera at Index Fungorum

Microascales